Érik Canuel (born 1961) is a film director and actor from Montreal, Quebec, Canada.
 
Canuel, the son of actor Yvan Canuel, began his career in the mid-1980s making music videos for such artists as Paul Piché, Sass Jordan, Norman Iceberg, Vilain Pingouin and Sylvain Cossette. After shooting a number of TV commercials, several of them award-winners, he worked as a director on the television series Big Wolf on Campus, for the Fox network, and The Hunger, broadcast on Showtime and The Movie Network.

In 2000, his Imax film Hemingway: A Portrait won a Genie Award for best short documentary, as well as the Maximum Image Award for best 2D film at the Miami Aventura Imax Days. Canuel also directed Matthew Blackheart: Monster Smasher in 2000, The Pig's Law (La Loi du cochon) in 2001, Red Nose (Nez rouge) in 2003, The Last Tunnel (Le Dernier Tunnel) in 2004, The Outlander (Le Survenant) in 2005, and Bon Cop, Bad Cop in 2006, receiving numerous nominations and awards.

In 2010, Canuel directed the episode "Fa la Erica" (season 3, ep. 11) of the TV series Being Erica. In 2016, he directed a segment of the collective film 9 (9, le film).

In 2020, Canuel directed the last four episodes entitled "Collapse", "Orphans", "Relapse" and "The Only Way Out Is Through" of the first season of the TV series Transplant.

He often makes cameo appearances as a bit part actor in his own films.

References

External links

1964 births
Living people
Canadian television directors
Directors of Genie and Canadian Screen Award winners for Best Short Documentary Film
French Quebecers
Film directors from Montreal
Canadian Comedy Award winners
Canadian music video directors
Television commercial directors